Lemyra multivittata is a moth of the family Erebidae. It was described by Frederic Moore in 1865. It is found in Nepal, India (Himachal-Pradesh, Sikkim, Assam), Myanmar and China (Yunnan, Tibet).

References

 

multivittata
Moths described in 1865